Minle County is a county in Gansu province of the People's Republic of China, bordering Qinghai province to the south. It is under the administration of the prefecture-level city of Zhangye. Its postal code is 734500, and in 1999 its population was  people.

Administrative divisions
Minle County is divided to 10 towns and 1 other.
Towns

Others
 Minle Ecological Industrial Park()

Climate

Transport 
China National Highway 227
 on the Lanzhou–Xinjiang High-Speed Railway

See also
 List of administrative divisions of Gansu

References

甘肃各县市地区生产总值列表

Minle County
Zhangye